Ana Cheminava (born 1 February 1996) is a Georgian footballer, who plays as a forward for the Turkish Women's Super Leagıue club Fomget G.S., and the Georgia women's national team.

Club career
Between 2015 and 2021, Cheminava played for the Lithuanian Women's A League club MFA Žalgiris.

By December 2021, she moved to Turkey and joined the Ankara-based club Fomget G.S. to play in the 2021–22 Turkcell Women's Super League.

International career

Cheminava was a member of the Georgia girls' U17 (2012–2013= and the Georgia women's U19 (2014–2015) teams.

She has been capped for the Georgia national team, appearing for the team during the 2019 FIFA Women's World Cup qualifying cycle.

References

External links
 
 
 

1996 births
Living people
Women's footballers from Georgia (country)
Women's association football forwards
Fomget Gençlik ve Spor players
Turkish Women's Football Super League players
Georgia (country) women's international footballers
Expatriate sportspeople from Georgia (country)
Expatriate sportspeople from Georgia (country) in Lithuania
Expatriate women's footballers in Lithuania
Expatriate women's footballers from Georgia (country)
Expatriate women's footballers in Turkey
Expatriate sportspeople from Georgia (country) in Turkey
Saudi Women's Premier League players